Pukewairiki located in Highbrook Park is a volcano in the Auckland volcanic field in the North Island of New Zealand.

Pukewairiki  has an explosion crater around 500 m wide, and a tuff ring up to 30 m high, which has been eroded away on the south-western side. The northern side had a terrace eroded into at a time of higher sea-level during the Last Interglacial and thus the volcano is older than 130,000 yrs. In the past it has erroneously been called Pukekiwiriki, which is the name for Red Hill, Papakura.

References

City of Volcanoes: A geology of Auckland - Searle, Ernest J.; revised by Mayhill, R.D.; Longman Paul, 1981. First published 1964. .
Volcanoes of Auckland: The Essential guide - Hayward, B.W., Murdoch, G., Maitland, G.; Auckland University Press, 2011.
Volcanoes of Auckland: A Field Guide. Hayward, B.W.; Auckland University Press, 2019, 335 pp. .

Auckland volcanic field